"Happy Ending" is a song by British singer-songwriter and musician Joe Jackson, which was recorded as a duet with Elaine Caswell and released in April 1984 as the second single from Jackson's sixth studio album Body and Soul. The song was written by Jackson, and produced by Jackson and David Kershenbaum. "Happy Ending" reached No. 58 in the UK Singles Chart and No. 57 on the US Billboard Hot 100.

Background
In a 1984 interview, Jackson discussed the song's sound and lyrical message,

Critical reception
On its release, Frank Edmonds of the Bury Free Press gave the song a 7.5 out of 10 rating and commented, "Attractive male/female vocal sparring in a catch song, even if they do seem in a hurry to see the end of it."

Billboard described "Happy Ending" as "uptempo pop" that was in "middle ground between the spontaneous-sounding R&B of "You Can't Get What You Want" and the precise craftsmanship of Jackson's Night and Day hits." David Okamoto of The Tampa Tribune felt the song deserved to be a hit and described it as "wonderfully empty-headed boy-meets-girl love song in the '60s tradition".

In a review of Body and Soul, Steve Pond of the Los Angeles Times noted the song "rolls along at an infectious pace while tossing out echoes of the Ronettes along the way". Eleni P. Austin of The Desert Sun praised the song's "killer tenor sax solo" that "blends into a complete brass blast". She also added, "Caswell's voice is somewhat similar to Ronnie Spector's and it lends itself quite nicely to Jackson's breathy vocals".

Track listing
7" single
"Happy Ending" - 3:39
"Loisaida" - 5:33

7" single (US promo)
"Happy Ending" - 3:39
"Happy Ending" - 3:39

12" single (UK release)
"Happy Ending" - 3:39
"Loisaida" - 5:33

Personnel
Happy Ending
 Joe Jackson - vocals, alto saxophone
 Elaine Caswell - vocals
 Vinnie Zummo - guitar
 Ed Roynesdal - piano
 Tony Aiello - tenor saxophone
 Mike Morreale - trumpet
 Graham Maby - bass
 Gary Burke - drums

Loisaida
 Joe Jackson - piano
 Ed Roynesdal - synthesisers
 Vinnie Zummo - guitar
 Tony Aiello - alto saxophone
 Mike Morreale - flugelhorn, trumpet
 Graham Maby - bass
 Gary Burke - drums

Production
 Joe Jackson - producer, arranger
 David Kershenbaum - producer
 Rik Pekkonen - engineer
 Bernie Grundman - mastering

Other
 Melanie Nissen - cover design
 Charles Reilly - photography

Charts

References

1984 songs
1984 singles
Joe Jackson (musician) songs
Songs written by Joe Jackson (musician)
Song recordings produced by David Kershenbaum
A&M Records singles